John Devereux of Manne (Whitchurch Maund) was a member of a prominent knightly family in Herefordshire during the reigns of Edward II, and Edward III.  He fought at the Battle of Crecy, and gave rise to the Devereux Barons of Whitchurch Maund.

Childhood and Ancestry

John Devereux was born in 1302, the son of Walter Devereux of Bodenham, and Margery de Braose. His family had experienced the loss of their patrimony including Lyonshall Castle, and his father did not retain the barony granted to his grandfather, William Devereux. John’s youth was spent in close alliance with his older brother, Stephen Devereux of Bodenham and Burghope, in trying to revive the family fortunes.

The ancestral arms of the Devereux family, and that of the Devereux of Bodenham were: Argent, a fesse and in chief three roundlets gules.  To distinguish themselves, the Devereux family of Whitchurch Maund added a mullet or.

Career

John Devereux is identified as a witness to a grant of a croft in 1317 in the town of la More (Hereford) by Thomas Swonild to Thomas de Houton (and his sons, Walter and Hugh) between the lands of his father, Sir Walter Devereux, and the Tyne brook. On 11 December 1323 a commission of oyer and terminer was called to investigate a complaint by Richard de Portes that ‘John Deueres’ was among a group of men that assaulted him at Gloucester, and broke the gates and doors of his houses at Bromesberwe (Yockeford), and Dunhampton (county Gloucester), cut down his trees and carried them and other goods away.

He came of age in 1323, and was a witness at the inquisition regarding the ongoing Mortimer insurrection on 22 January 1324. He was listed among a number of Hereford men who testified about the actions of Mortimer’s men and accomplices, and the complicity of the Bishop of Hereford in their action.  His brother, Stephen Devereux, was listed among the jurors.

On March 6, 1327 John Devereux was described as the king’s yeoman.  He was granted the bailiwick of the ‘chace of Cors’ in county Gloucester. On 26 July 1327 Hugh fitzThomas and Hugh fitzSymond recognized a debt of 30 shillings to John Devereux.

On 20 September 1332 a grant for three years was given to William de Leversete and John Deveroys of the right to take customs specified in the letters patent on goods for sale brought to the town of Ideshale and Welynton, county Salop, and passing through those towns or along the highway between them, for repairing the causeway. This was renewed on 8 December 1335 for another 3 years. Also in 1335, John Devereux along with Stephen Devereux and Roger Devereux witnessed land transactions in Whitchurch Maund, and Rosemaund in the parish of Bodenham.

John Devereux participated in Edward III’s invasion of France in 1346 as part of the retinue of Laurence Hastings, 1st Earl of Pembroke, and was present at the Battle of Crécy. He died shortly after this time.

Marriage

John Devereux married Margaret Barre,. They had a son: 
John Devereux, 1st Baron Devereux

References

Notes

1302 births
John
1340s deaths